Negative gearing is a form of financial leverage whereby an investor borrows money to acquire an income-producing investment and the gross income generated by the investment (at least in the short term) is less than the cost of owning and managing the investment, including depreciation and interest charged on the loan (but excluding capital repayments). The investor may enter into a negatively geared investment expecting tax benefits or the capital gain on the investment after it is sold to exceed the accumulated losses of holding the investment. The investor would take into account the tax treatment of negative gearing, which may generate additional benefits to the investor in the form of tax benefits if the loss on a negatively geared investment is tax-deductible against the investor's other taxable income and if the capital gain on the sale is given a favourable tax treatment.

Overview
Negative gearing is often discussed with regard to real estate, where rental income is less than mortgage loan interest costs, but may also apply to shares in companies whose dividend income falls short of interest costs on a margin loan. The tax treatment may or may not be the same between the two.

Positive gearing occurs when one borrows to invest in an income-producing asset and the returns (income) from that asset exceed the cost of borrowing. From then on, the investor must pay tax on the rental income profit until the asset is sold, at which point the investor must pay capital gains tax on any profit.

When the income generated covers the interest, it is simply a geared investment, which creates passive income. A negative gearing strategy makes a profit under any of the following circumstances:

if the asset rises in value so that the capital gain is more than the sum of the ongoing losses over the life of the investment;
if the income stream rises to become greater than the cost of interest (the investment becomes positively geared); or
if the interest cost falls because of lower interest rates or paying down the loan principal, making the investment positively geared.

The investor must be able to fund any shortfall until the asset is sold or until the investment becomes positively geared. The different tax treatment of planned ongoing losses and possible future capital gains affects the investor's final return. In countries that tax capital gains at a lower rate than income, it is possible for an investor to make a loss overall before taxation but a small gain after taxpayer subsidies.

Some countries, including Australia and Japan, allow unrestricted use of negative gearing losses to offset income from other sources. Several other Organisation for Economic Co-operation and Development countries, including the United States of America, New Zealand, Germany, Sweden, Canada, and France, allow loss offsetting with some restrictions. Applying tax deductions from negatively geared investment housing to other income is not permitted in the United Kingdom or the Netherlands. With respect to investment decisions and market prices, other taxes such as stamp duties and capital gains tax may be more or less onerous in those countries, increasing or decreasing the attractiveness of residential property as an investment.

A negatively-geared investment property will generally remain negatively geared for several years, when the rental income will have increased with inflation to the point that the investment is positively geared (the rental income is greater than the interest cost).

The tax treatment of negative gearing (also termed "rental loss offset against other income") varies. For example:
 the United States restricts the practice to lower/middle income taxpayers who are active in managing their rental investment and also allows interest costs against the family home to be fully tax deductible.
 Canada limits the practice by ensuring the investment generated a positive return over its life.
 countries with lower tax rates have a lower benefit from negative gearing due to a lower top rate of tax or a higher threshold for a specific tax rate.

Taxation implications of negative gearing by country

Australia

Negative gearing can be a tax-effective strategy in Australia, because the tax system has a single income tax schedule for income from all sources. This means that for taxation purposes net investment income losses can be offset against other types of income, such as wage or business income, with only a few limits or restrictions.

Negative gearing continues to be a controversial political issue in Australia and was a major issue during the 2016 Australian federal election and the 2019 Australian federal election, during which the Australian Labor Party proposed to eliminate the tax-deductibility of negative gearing losses against non-investment income (with some exceptions), and to halve the capital gains tax discount to 25%. Analysis found that negative gearing in Australia provides a greater benefit to wealthier Australians than the less wealthy.

Federal Treasurer at the time, Scott Morrison, in defence of negative gearing, cited tax data that showed that numerous middle income groups (he mentioned teachers, nurses, and electricians) benefit in larger numbers from negative gearing than finance managers.

United Kingdom
While allowing for negative gearing in its basic form, the United Kingdom does not allow the transfer of one type of income (or loss) to another type of income. This is due to its schedular system of taxation. In this type of taxation system, the tax paid is dependent on income source. Therefore, an individual who received an income from labour and from land would pay two separate tax rates for the two relevant income sources.

Between 1997 and 2007, the Tax Law Rewrite Project changed this system by simplifying the schedules. As with the previous system, people would not be allowed to transfer incomes (or losses).

A UK government online resource on renting out property in England and Wales outlines how to offset losses. It states that losses can be offset against "future profits by carrying it forward to a later year" or against "profits from other properties (if you have them)".

New Zealand
New Zealand abolished negative gearing in March 2021 and it will be fully phased out by April 2025.

The Rental Income Guide states a loss can only be deducted against other incomes if the rental income is at market rate.

The Opposition Labour Party attempted to raise negative gearing in the 2011 election, but after their failure to win government the issue reduced in significance.

New Zealand now has ring-fencing rules, abolishing negative gearing in the residential property market. Residential property deductions can only be made against residential property income and cannot be deducted from income from other sources, e.g. wages.

Canada

In principle, Canada does not allow the transfer of income streams. However, the most current Canadian tax form indicates this can occur in some circumstances. According to "Line 221 - Carrying charges and interest expenses", interest payments from an investment designed to generate an income can be deducted:Claim the following carrying charges and interest you paid to earn income from investments: [...] Most interest you pay on money you borrow for investment purposes, but generally only if you use it to try to earn investment income, including interest and dividends. However, if the only earnings your investment can produce are capital gains, you cannot claim the interest you paid.Other sources indicate the deduction must be reasonable and that people should contact the Canada Revenue Agency for more information. The "Rental Income Includes Form T776" states people can deduce rental losses from other sources of income: "You have a rental loss if your rental expenses are more than your gross rental income. If you incur the expenses to earn income, you can deduct your rental loss against your other sources of income." However, there is a caveat: the rental loss must be reasonable. What is reasonable is not defined in the "Rental Income Includes Form T776" Guide.

Based on these sources, claiming rental losses against other incomes in a given year is allowed as long as a profit is made over the life of the investment, excluding the effects of capital gains.

Canada has a Federal and Provincial income tax, and the above only relates to Federal income tax.

United States
In principle, the US federal tax does not allow the transfer of income streams. In general, taxpayers can only deduct expenses of renting property from their rental income, as renting property out is usually considered a passive activity. However, if renters are considered to have actively participated in the activities, they can claim deductions from rental losses against their other "nonpassive income". A definition of "active participation" is outlined in the "Reporting Rental Income, Expenses, and Losses" guide:You actively participated in a rental real estate activity if you (and your spouse) owned at least 10% of the rental property and you made management decisions or arranged for others to provide services (such as repairs) in a significant and bona fide sense. Management decisions that may count as active participation include approving new tenants, deciding on rental terms, approving expenditures, and other similar decisions.It is possible to deduct any loss against other incomes, depending on a range of factors.

Japan
Japan allows tax payers to offset rental losses against other income.

Individuals can claim losses against rental loss with minimal restrictions, but if the property was owned through a partnership or trust there are restrictions.

There are a number of additional rules, such as restricting claims of losses due to Bad Debt. Additional information can be found in the Japan Tax Site.

Germany
The German tax system is complex, but within the bounds of standard federal income tax, Germany does allow the transfer of income under certain conditions. Rental losses can be offset against rental income and against income from other income streams including employment income, income from independent personal services and trade and business income.  In order for losses from renting and leasing to be offset against income or profits from other types of income, it must be established that there is an intention to generate a profit from the source of income generating the losses. In the case of real estate that is rented out for regular residential purposes, the German tax authorities generally assume an intention to generate a profit, unless the real estate is rented out at unusual low conditions (less than 2/3 of a comparable rent). 

Germany recognizes seven sources of income:

 Agriculture and forestry
 Trade and business
 Independent personal services
 Employment
 Capital investment
 Rents and royalties
 "other income", as specified and strictly limited by law to certain types of income such as income from private transactions and income of a recurring nature (e.g. pensions)

The income from each of these sources is calculated separately.

Rental income is taxed as income and is subject to the progressive tax rate. Interest on loans provided to finance real estate, expenses, and property-related cost (e.g., management fees, insurance) can be deducted from the taxable rental income.

If real estate is held as private assets (i.e. not as a business asset), the gain from the sale of a property after a holding period of more than 10 years is generally tax-free respectively does not constitute taxable income. However, there are exceptions to this rule, e.g. it is assumed that the sale of three "objects" (individual properties, real estate or rights equivalent to real estate) within 5 years constitutes a business activity and that the income generated from the sale is therefore business income and not possibly tax-exempt "other income".

Netherlands
In principle, the Dutch tax system does not allow the transfer of income. Most citizens calculate tax, separately, in 3 income groups:
 
 Box 1 income includes income from employment and income from the primary residence
 Box 2 income, which includes income from a substantial holding in a company, as well as gains from substantial shareholdings
 Box 3 deals with income from savings and investments

Dutch resident and non-resident companies and partnerships owning Dutch property are in principle allowed to deduct interest expenses on loans from banks or affiliated companies, and property-related costs from their taxable income.

See also
 Debt
 Financial engineering
 Leveraged buyout
 Rent seeking

References

External links
 Negative Gearing Issue Sheet for the 2004 Australian federal election
 Australian Taxation Office Rental Properties Guide 2005, product NAT 1729-6.2005
 Real Estate Institute of Australia Policy Statement on Negative Gearing, as of October 2005
 Negative Gearing—A Commentary on how it works and who it is suited to
 Negative Gearing — A Brief Overview of Negative Gearing In Australia and why people choose to do it: (Accountants, Caringbah Sydney, Australia)
 Australian Democrats Negative Gearing Issue Sheet for the 2004 Election (PDF)
 Australian Taxation Office Rental Properties Guide 2005, product NAT 1729-6.2005
 Real Estate Institute of Australia Policy Statement on Negative Gearing, as of October 2005
 Negative gearing: The three facts that will challenge your assumptions, Property Observer, 2013

Real estate in Australia
Investment
Real estate investing